Parmentiera morii is a plant species in the family Bignoniaceae. It is endemic to Panama.  It is threatened by habitat loss.

References

Flora of Panama
morii
Critically endangered plants
Taxonomy articles created by Polbot